The year 2020 was the 17th year in the history of the Konfrontacja Sztuk Walki, a mixed martial arts promotion based in Poland. 2020 will begin with KSW 53.

Background
Martin Lewandowski announced that KSW has plans for European expansion and will intend to do a new series of smaller events in 2020.
KSW has plans for a reality TV show.

List of events

Only One
The series was officially announced by KSW and POLSAT TV at a press conference on December 7, 2019. The trainers for the series, which will feature 10 welterweight fighters, will be Marcin Wrzosek and Łukasz Zaborowski. The 10 fighters will be competing for a contract with KSW. The weekly series will culminate in a live finale on POLSAT TV. It debuted on POLSAT TV on March 6, 2020.

Participants
  Paweł Kiełek 
  Piotr Walawski
  Mariusz Radziszewski
  Marcin Krakowiak
  Bartłomiej Gładkowicz 
  Kamil Dołgowski
  Adrian Bartosiński
  Tomasz Romanowski
  Michał Sobiech
  Karol Wesling

KSW Tylko Jeden Tournament bracket

1Bartek Gładkowicz missed weight and was expelled from the show, he was subsequently replaced by Paweł Kiełek who get a second chance in the show.

2Adrian Bartosiński was injured and couldn't participate in the final, and was subsequently replaced by Marcin Krakowiak.

KSW 53: Reborn

'KSW 53: Reborn' was a mixed martial arts event held by Konfrontacja Sztuk Walki on July 11, 2020 in Warsaw, Poland.

The event was initially planned to be held on March 21, 2020 at the Atlas Arena in Łódź, Poland. However, the event was cancelled on March 11, 2020, due to the COVID-19 pandemic.

Background
Norman Parke missed weight ahead of his trilogy bout with Mateusz Gamrot for the undisputed KSW Lightweight Title. Both parties have agreed to complete their trilogy, however, the bout was a five-round catchweight non-title bout.

Roman Szymański was scheduled to face Mateusz Legierski, but Legierski was forced off the card on June 25 with an injury. Filip Pejić served as Legierski's replacement, taking the short notice fight against Szymański.

Bonus awards

The following fighters were awarded bonuses:
 Fight of the Night: Roman Szymański vs. Filip Pejić  
 Knockout of the Night: Michał Pietrzak 
 Knockout of the Night: Sebastian Przybysz

Results

KSW 54: Gamrot vs. Ziółkowski

'KSW 54: Gamrot vs. Ziółkowski' was a mixed martial arts event held by Konfrontacja Sztuk Walki on August 29, 2020 in Warsaw, Poland.

Background
Shamil Musaev was scheduled to challenge Mateusz Gamrot in the KSW 54 main event, but Musaev has to withdraw from the bout due to a knee injury sustained in training. Marian Ziółkowski was pulled from a planned bout with Maciej Kazieczko and faced Gamrot for the KSW Lightweight Championship in the KSW 54 main event. Kazieczko instead faced Karlo Caput who stepped in on short notice for this encounter.

Łukasz Rajewski missed weight by two pounds ahead of his scheduled lightweight bout with Bartłomiej Kopera. Both parties have agreed to compete a catchweight bout, Rajewski has been fined 30 percent of his purse.

Bonus awards

The following fighters were awarded bonuses:
 Fight of the Night: Łukasz Rajewski vs. Bartłomiej Kopera
 Knockout of the Night: Michał Kita
 Performance of the Night: Sebastian Rajewski

Results

KSW 55: Askham vs. Khalidov 2

'KSW 55: Askham vs. Khalidov 2' was a mixed martial arts event held by Konfrontacja Sztuk Walki on October 10, 2020 at the Wytwórnia Club in Łódź, Poland.

Background
A KSW Middleweight Championship rematch between current champion Scott Askham and former champion Mamed Khalidov served as the event's headliner. The pairing met previously at KSW 52: Race on December 7, 2019 in a catchweight non-title bout, Askham had dominated Khalidov during three round to capture the unanimous decision win.

Bonus awards

The following fighters were awarded bonuses:
 Fight of the Night: Michał Materla vs. Aleksandar Ilić
 Knockout of the Night: Mamed Khalidov
 Submission of the Night: Damian Stasiak

Results

Genesis: Różalski vs. Barnett

'Genesis: Różalski vs. Barnett' was a bare-knuckle fighting event held by Konfrontacja Sztuk Walki on October 23, 2020.

Background
KSW has launched a new bare knuckle fighting event serie called Genesis.

Former UFC heavyweight Josh Barnett returned to the ring when he took on the former KSW heavyweight champion Marcin Rozalski in a bare-knuckle boxing match in the first main event under the Genesis banner.

Results

KSW 56: Materla vs. Soldić

KSW 56: Materla vs. Soldić was a mixed martial arts event held by Konfrontacja Sztuk Walki on November 14, 2020 at the Wytwórnia Club in Łódź, Poland.

Background
In the event headliner, the reigning KSW welterweight champion Roberto Soldić has move up to 185 pounds to challenge the former KSW middleweight champion Michał Materla.

The co-main event of the evening featured a title bout between the reigning KSW light heavyweight champion Tomasz Narkun and the undeafeated Croatian Ivan Erslan.

Sebastian Rajewski was scheduled to face Michał Sobiech, but Sobiech was forced off the card on November 4 due to a hand injury. Filip Pejić served as Sobiech replacement, takes short notice fight against Rajewski.

Bonus awards

The following fighters were awarded bonuses:
 Fight of the Night: Daniel Torres vs. Max Coga 
 Knockout of the Night: Filip Pejić
 Submission of the Night: Robert Ruchała

Results

KSW 57: De Fries vs. Kita

'KSW 57: De Fries vs. Kita' was a mixed martial arts event held by Konfrontacja Sztuk Walki on December 19, 2020 at the Wytwórnia Club in Łódź, Poland.

Background
The event featured three title fights. In the headliner, Phil De Fries has put his KSW heavyweight crown on the line against Michał Kita. Marian Ziółkowski and Roman Szymański has battled for the vacant KSW lightweight belt and KSW bantamweight champion, Antun Račić, has met Bruno dos Santos in the first defense of his KSW bantamweight title.

Bonus awards

The following fighters were awarded bonuses:
 Fight of the Night: Marcin Krakowiak vs. Kacper Koziorzębski
 Knockout of the Night: Marian Ziółkowski
 Submission of the Night: Abusupiyan Magomedov

Results

See also
 2020 in UFC
 2020 in Bellator MMA
 2020 in ONE Championship
 2020 in Absolute Championship Akhmat
 2020 in Rizin Fighting Federation
 2020 in Legacy Fighting Alliance
 2020 in RXF

References

External links
KSW 

2020 in mixed martial arts
Konfrontacja Sztuk Walki events
Konfrontacja Sztuk Walki events
2020 sport-related lists